Knema laurina is a species of tree in the family Myristicaceae. It is native to Peninsular Thailand, Sumatra (incl. Simeulue, Siberut, Bangka), Peninsular Malaysia, Java, and Borneo.

References 

laurina
Flora of Malesia